The 2015 Porsche Carrera Cup Deutschland season was the 30th German Porsche Carrera Cup season. It began on 3 May at Hockenheim and finished on 18 October at the same circuit, after eighteen races, with two races at each event. It was a support championship for the 2015 Deutsche Tourenwagen Masters.

Teams and drivers

Race calendar and results

Championship standings

A-class

† — Drivers did not finish the race, but were classified as they completed over 90% of the race distance.

B-class

† — Drivers did not finish the race, but were classified as they completed over 90% of the race distance.

References

External links
 
 Porsche Carrera Cup Germany Online Magazine 

Porsche Carrera Cup Germany seasons
Porsche Carrera Cup Germany